Bruce Baldwin (born 17 May 1950) is a New Zealand cricketer. He played in one List A match for Central Districts in 1977/78.

See also
 List of Central Districts representative cricketers

References

External links
 

1950 births
Living people
New Zealand cricketers
Central Districts cricketers
Cricketers from Whanganui